Mats Rosseli Olsen (born April 29, 1991) is a Norwegian professional ice hockey forward, currently playing for Frölunda HC in the Swedish Hockey League (SHL).

Playing career
Mats Rosseli Olsen started his professional career in 2008 in the Norwegian GET-league, playing for Furuset, where he grew up. In the 2008–09 season, he noted 20 points in 44 games. In 2009, he joined Vålerenga. After two and a half seasons in Vålerenga, he signed a one and a half-year deal with Frölunda HC of the Swedish Elitserien on January 28, 2012. Rosseli Olsen has also represented the Norwegian national team.

Career statistics

Regular season and playoffs

International

Awards and honors

References

External links

1991 births
Living people
Frölunda HC players
Furuset Ishockey players
Ice hockey players at the 2014 Winter Olympics
Ice hockey players at the 2018 Winter Olympics
Norwegian expatriate ice hockey people
Norwegian expatriate sportspeople in Sweden
Norwegian ice hockey left wingers
Olympic ice hockey players of Norway
Ice hockey people from Oslo
Vålerenga Ishockey players